Mia Brix (born 8 May 1990 in Copenhagen) is a Danish figure skater. She is the 2009 Danish national bronze medalist. She did not compete internationally in the 2007-2008 season.

Programs

Competitive highlights

 J = Junior level; QR = Qualifying Round

References

 

Danish female single skaters
Sportspeople from Copenhagen
Living people
1990 births